Horseshoe Bend Airport  is a privately owned public airport in Weatherford, Parker County, Texas, United States, located approximately  southwest of the central business district. The airport has no IATA or ICAO designation.

The airport is used solely for general aviation purposes.

Facilities 
 Runway 17/35: 3,000 x 30 ft. (914 x 9 m), surface: turf

For the 12-month period ending 27 April 2016, the airport had 4,000 aircraft operations, an average of 11 per day: 100% general aviation. At that time there were 13 aircraft based at this airport: 77% single-engine and 23% ultralights, with no multi-engine, jets, helicopters, nor gliders.

References

External links 
  at Texas DOT Airport Directory

Airports in Texas
Airports in the Dallas–Fort Worth metroplex
Transportation in Parker County, Texas